We Shall Overcome: The Seeger Sessions is the fourteenth studio album by Bruce Springsteen. Released in 2006, it peaked at number three on the Billboard 200 and won the Grammy Award for Best Traditional Folk Album at the 49th Grammy Awards.

Background
This is Springsteen's first album of entirely non-Springsteen material and contains his interpretation of thirteen folk songs made popular by activist folk musician Pete Seeger. Using songs written by others, Seeger focused on popularizing and promoting the ethic of local, historical musical influences and recognizing the cultural significance that folk music embodies.

Springsteen's project began in 1997, when he recorded "We Shall Overcome" for the Where Have All the Flowers Gone: the Songs of Pete Seeger tribute album, released the following year. Springsteen had not known much about Seeger, given his rock and roll upbringing, and investigated Seeger's music. While playing the songs in his house, Springsteen was given more reason to continue when his 10-year-old daughter said, "Hey, that sounds like fun."

Soozie Tyrell, the violinist in the E Street Band, connected with a group of lesser-known musicians from New Jersey and New York City, and they joined Springsteen to record in an informal setting in Springsteen's Colts Neck farm. The Miami Horns and Springsteen's wife, Patti Scialfa, participated. This group would become the Sessions Band. The subsequent Bruce Springsteen with the Seeger Sessions Band Tour expanded on the album's musical approach.

Release 
The album, like its predecessor Devils and Dust, has been released on DualDisc, in a CD/DVD double disc set, and as a set of two vinyl records.

For the DualDisc and CD/DVD sets, the full album is on the CD(-side), while the DVD(-side) side features a PCM Stereo version of the album and a short film about the making and recording of the album. Two bonus songs also appear on the DVD(-side).

On October 3, 2006, the album was reissued as We Shall Overcome: The Seeger Sessions - American Land Edition with five additional tracks (the two bonus tracks from before and three new tracks that had been introduced and heavily featured on the tour), new videos, an expanded documentary and liner notes. Rather than a DualDisc release, the American Land Edition was released with separate CD and DVDs. Added sales were minimal.

Reception 

We Shall Overcome received widespread acclaim from music critics. At Metacritic, which assigns a normalized rating out of 100 to reviews from mainstream critics, the album received an average score of 82, based on 25 reviews. In his review for AllMusic, Stephen Thomas Erlewine praised Springsteen's modern take on Seeger's repertoire of folk songs and said that it is the liveliest album of his career: "It's a rambunctious, freewheeling, positively joyous record unlike any other in Springsteen's admittedly rich catalog." David Browne of Entertainment Weekly felt that Springsteen successfully imbues the songs with a "rock & roll energy" rather than an adherence to folk's blander musical aesthetic. Rolling Stone magazine's Jonathan Ringen believed that he relied on folk and Americana styles on the album in order to "find a moral compass for a nation that's gone off the rails", particularly on the implicitly political "Oh, Mary Don't You Weep", "Eyes on the Prize", and "We Shall Overcome". Gavin Martin of Uncut called it "a great teeming flood of Americana" and "a powerful example of how songs reverberate through the years to accrue contemporary meaning".

In a less enthusiastic review, Neil Spencer of The Observer wrote that the songs chosen for the album lack intrigue and edge, and are "mostly too corny to have much drama restored to them". Robert Christgau panned We Shall Overcome in his consumer guide for The Village Voice, wherein he gave it a "B", which is assigned to bad albums he reviews as the "dud of the month" in his column. He felt that Springsteen relies too much on a rural drawl and overblown sound when folk music requires subtlety and viewed the album as the worst case of his histrionic singing.

Seeger himself was pleased by the result, saying "It was a great honor. [Springsteen]'s an extraordinary person, as well as an extraordinary singer." We Shall Overcome was voted the 19th best album of the year in the Pazz & Jop, an annual critics poll run by The Village Voice. In 2007, it won the Grammy Award for Best Traditional Folk Album at the 49th Grammy Awards. By January 2009, the album had sold 700,000 copies in the United States. the RIAA certified it with gold record status.

Track listing
All songs traditional or public domain with unknown songwriters and arranged by Bruce Springsteen, unless otherwise noted.

Unreleased outtakes
A handful of outtakes went unreleased from the final cut of the album. Springsteen would later release some of these on the American Land version of the album while songs such as the instrumental "Once Upon a Time in the West" was released on the We All Love Ennio Morricone album, a cover of Pete Seeger's "Hobo's Lullaby" made its way onto the Give Us Your Poor charity album. A re-recorded version of Springsteen's "The Ghost of Tom Joad", which featured Pete Seeger, was released on the Sowing the Seeds charity album. A studio version of "Bring 'Em Home" was also released by Sony as an internet download. During these sessions Springsteen also first recorded "Long Walk Home". This version remains unreleased, although it was performed during this tour and would eventually be re-recorded for his next album, 2007's Magic. Two live versions of "American Land" were released; however, the studio recording from these sessions has yet to surface. Springsteen would re-record the song for his 2012 album, Wrecking Ball.

"American Land"
"Long Walk Home"
"I Come and Stand At Every Door"
"Pretty Boy Floyd"
"Michael, Row Your Boat Ashore"
"If I Had a Hammer"
"Worried Man Blues"

Personnel
Adapted from the liner notes:

Seeger Sessions Studio Band
Bruce Springsteen – lead vocals, guitar, mandolin, B3 organ, piano, percussion, harmonica, tambourine
 Sam Bardfeld – violin (tracks 1–15), backing vocals (tracks 2, 8, 11)
 Art Baron – tuba (tracks 6, 7, 9, 10, 14)
 Frank Bruno – guitar (tracks 1–14), backing vocals (tracks 1, 2, 4, 6–8, 10, 11)
 Jeremy Chatzky – upright bass (tracks 1–15), backing vocals (tracks 8, 11)
 Mark Clifford – banjo (tracks 1, 2, 4–14), backing vocals (tracks 1, 8, 11)
 Larry Eagle – drums & percussion (tracks 1–15), backing vocals (tracks 8, 11)
 Charles Giordano – B3 organ (tracks 1, 7, 10), piano (tracks 3, 4, 7, 10, 12), accordion (tracks 2, 4–14), pump organ (track 15), backing vocals (tracks 8, 11)
 Eddie Manion – saxophone (tracks 1, 2, 4–15), backing vocals (tracks 11, 12)
 Mark Pender – trumpet (tracks 1, 4–7, 9–15), backing vocals (tracks 1, 2, 4, 6, 7, 9–12, 14, 15)
 Richie "La Bamba" Rosenberg – trombone (tracks 1, 2, 4–15), backing vocals (tracks 1, 2, 4, 6–12, 14, 15)
 Patti Scialfa – backing vocals (tracks 1, 4, 6, 7, 9–12, 14, 15)
 Soozie Tyrell – violin (tracks 1–15), backing vocals (tracks 1, 2, 4, 6–12, 14, 15)
Seeger Sessions Tour Band

 Bruce Springsteen – guitar, lead vocal
 Sam Bardfeld – violin (tracks 16–18)
 Art Baron – tuba (track 16), mandolin (track 17), penny whistle (track 18)
 Frank Bruno – guitar (tracks 16–18)
 Jeremy Chatzky – upright bass (tracks 16–18)
 Larry Eagle – drums, percussion (tracks 16–18)
 Clark Gayton – trombone (tracks 16–18)
 Charles Giordano – B3 organ (track 16), piano (track 16), accordion (tracks 17, 18)
 Curtis King, Jr. – backing vocals (tracks 16–18)
 Greg Liszt – banjo (tracks 16–18)
 Lisa Lowell – backing vocals (tracks 16–18)
 Eddie Manion – saxophone (tracks 16–18)
 Cindy Mizelle – backing vocals (tracks 16–18)
 Mark Pender – trumpet (tracks 16–18)
 Curt Ramm – trumpet (track 18)
 Marty Rifkin – pedal steel (tracks 16, 17), dobro (track 18)
 Richie "La Bamba" Rosenberg – trombone (tracks 16–18)
 Patti Scialfa – guitar (tracks 16–18), backing vocals (tracks 16–18)
 Marc Anthony Thompson – guitar (tracks 17, 18), backing vocals (tracks 16–18)
 Soozie Tyrell – violin (tracks 16–18), backing vocals (tracks 16–18)

Technical

 Bruce Springsteen – production
 Toby Scott – recording (tracks 1–15)
 Kevin Buell, Ross Peterson – recording assistants (tracks 1–15)
 Richard Lowe – additional recording assistant  (tracks 1–15)
 John Cooper – recording (tracks 16–18)
 John Bruey – recording assistant (tracks 16–18)
 Bob Clearmountain – mixing 
 Brandon Duncan – mixing assistant 
 Giancarlo Gallo – mixing assistant (track 16)
 Bob Ludwig – mastering
 Chris Austopchuk – art direction
 Michelle Holme – art direction, design
 Meghan Foley – design
 Danny Clinch – photography
 Shari Sutcliffe – contractor

Charts

Weekly charts

Year-end charts

Certifications and sales

References

External links
 
 The Songs of the Seeger Sessions

Bruce Springsteen albums
2006 albums
Columbia Records albums
Albums produced by Jon Landau
Folk rock albums by American artists
Pete Seeger tribute albums